Legenda Bałtyku ("The Legend of the Baltic") is a 1924 Polish opera by Feliks Nowowiejski. It is a neo-romantic nationalist opera.

Legenda Bałtyku  premiered in Poznań, Poland, on 28 November 1924. Opera Poznan staged the opera in 1955 and Lodz Opera Company staged it in 1965.

Plot
The plot concerns the task set for the poor fisherman Doman (tenor) by Mestwin, the father of the maiden Bogna - to obtain the ring of Queen Jurata whose kingdom lies in the depths of the Baltic Sea. The second act aria of Doman "Czy ty mnie kochasz, o dziewczyno?" (Do you love me oh girl?") is still occasionally performed in recitals.

References

External links
 Ewa B. Aria lyrics and translation

Polish-language operas
1924 operas